Rockport is an unincorporated community in Wetzel County, West Virginia, United States. It lies at an elevation of 892 feet (272 m).

References

Unincorporated communities in Wetzel County, West Virginia
Unincorporated communities in West Virginia